The French Handball Federation (FFHB) is the national handball association in France. Founded on 1 September 1941, FFHB organizes handball and beach handball within France and represents France internationally. It sorts under the French Ministry of Youth Affairs and Sports. The federation is a member of the European Handball Federation (EHF), Mediterranean Handball Confederation and the International Handball Federation (IHF). The current president of FFHB is Philippe Bana since 28 November 2020.

FFHB Presidents

Club handball
The federation organizes the National League for club teams, and the French Cups for men and women ( and ). The winners of these tournaments qualify for European Leagues and Cups — the EHF Men's Champions League and the EHF Women's Champions League, and the Men's EHF Cup Winners' Cup and Women's EHF Cup Winners' Cup.

International handball
France hosted the men's World Championship in 1970, 2001 and 2017, and the women's World Championship in 2007.

The men's team
The men's national team is the current reigning World Champion. It was the first team in the world to win the three titles in a row (Including olympic gold). It is widely regarded as the best current men's handball team in the world. The team has won the World Championship title six times, in 1995, 2001, 2009, 2011, 2015 and 2017 and the European Championship three times, in 2006, 2010 and 2014 . The men's team won gold medals at the 2008 Summer Olympics in Beijing and 2012 Summer Olympics in London. Head coach for the men's national team is former player Didier Dinart.

The women's team
The France women's national handball team were the world champions after their victory at the 2017 World Championships and reigning European champions after winning the 2018 European Championships. The team also won gold at the 2003 World Championships in Croatia, and silver at the 1999 World Championships. The team was placed fifth at the 2008 Summer Olympics in Beijing.

Head coach for the women's national team is Olivier Krumbholz.

References

External links
 Official website

Handball in France
Handball
France